Proletarsky District is the name of several administrative and municipal districts in Russia. The name literally means "pertaining to proletariat".

Districts of the federal subjects

Proletarsky District, Rostov Oblast, an administrative and municipal district of Rostov Oblast

City divisions
Proletarsky City District, Rostov-on-Don, a city district of Rostov-on-Don, the administrative center of Rostov Oblast
Proletarsky City District, Saransk, a city district of Saransk, the capital of the Republic of Mordovia
Proletarsky City District, Tula, a city district of Tula, the administrative center of Tula Oblast
Proletarsky City District, Tver, a city district of Tver, the administrative center of Tver Oblast

See also
Proletarsky (disambiguation)
Proletarsk, name of several inhabited localities in Russia

References